The BMW XM is a plug-in hybrid electric full-size luxury crossover SUV manufactured by BMW under the BMW M subsidiary. It is the second car developed entirely by BMW M after the BMW M1 in 1978. A more powerful version, named "Label Red", was also announced alongside the unveiling of the XM on 27 September 2022.

Launch and development 
BMW was Art Basel's official partner for event's 2021 edition, where on the 29th of November BMW unveiled a concept version of the XM at Miami Beach, Florida. Production of the XM started in December 2022 at the BMW US Manufacturing Company plant in Greer, South Carolina, with deliveries expected to commence in 2023. BMW would also enter a gentlemen's agreement with French carmaker Citroën in order to be able to use the name "XM" for its vehicle, since Citroën originally used it for the XM.

BMW India announced that it would begin deliveries of the XM in May 2023.

BMW Manufacturing in Thailand announced the XM 50e xDrive on 28 February 2023 as an import from USA.

Specifications

The XM's internal combustion engine, the twin-turbocharged BMW S68, has been revised to have a stronger crankshaft, and the turbochargers have been placed closer to the exhaust manifold. BMW mentioned that this system is also used in their BMW M Hybrid V8 LMDh car, and will give the XM a  time of 4.1 s.

The XM has permanent four-wheel drive, with a bespoke M Sport differential situated at the rear axle allowing for torque vectoring. The XM's handling is controlled by 48-volt electrical active anti-roll bars along with steel springs, adaptive M dampers and active steering. Power is sent via an 8-speed automatic transmission to the 23" wheels which are shod in 275/35R23 tyres at the front and 315/30R23 at the rear.

References

External links 

 

XM
Cars introduced in 2022
Full-size sport utility vehicles
Luxury crossover sport utility vehicles
All-wheel-drive vehicles
Hybrid sport utility vehicles
Partial zero-emissions vehicles
Plug-in hybrid vehicles